Marina Piccola ("little harbor"; also Marina di Mulo) is located on the southern side of the island of Capri. It is near the Faraglioni sea stacks to the southeast. The Via Krupp is a historic switchback paved footpath which connect the Charterhouse of San Giacomo and the Gardens of Augustus area with Marina Piccola. 
The Marina Piccola, used by Augustus and Tiberius, preceded the Marina Grande.

See also
 Tyrrhenian Sea

References

Ports and harbours of Italy
Capri, Campania